"Girl on the Billboard" is a 1965 single released by American country music singer Del Reeves. The novelty song was Reeves' fourth entry on the U.S. country chart and his only No. 1 single. "Girl on the Billboard" spent two weeks at No. 1 and a total of 20 weeks on the chart, in addition to reaching No. 96 on the Billboard Hot 100, and has become one of many country standards about lust.

The Song's Story
The song is about a truck driver who falls in love with a picture of a beautiful young woman, whose towel-clad likeness is plastered as part of a roadside billboard advertisement along Route 66. The truck driver drives a daily freight route from Chicago to St. Louis along the highway where the billboard is located. He also notes how many trucker accidents have occurred near the billboard.

Early one morning (4:45 AM), while his diesel idles nearby, the trucker knocks on the door of the artist who painted the billboard and (presumably) asks for the model's contact information. The painter curtly tells the trucker that the "girl wasn't real" and that he'd "better get the (censored) on his way." (An electric guitar riff is used in place of the profanity). Disillusioned at his fantasy being ruined, the trucker moans that along the highway, "You'll find tiny pieces of my heart scattered every which a way."

Cover versions
In 2005, Canadian band The Road Hammers released a cover version on its debut album. It was later released in the U.S., peaking at No. 54 in 2008.

Chart performance

Del Reeves

The Road Hammers

References

1965 singles
Novelty songs
Del Reeves songs
The Road Hammers songs
Songs written by Hank Mills
1965 songs
United Artists Records singles
Music videos directed by Margaret Malandruccolo
Songs about truck driving
Songs written by Walter Haynes